Jim Power in Mutant Planet is a platform video game developed by Digital Concept and published by Loriciel for the Amiga, Atari ST and Amstrad CPC in 1992. It was also released by Micro World for the TurboGrafx-CD in 1993 exclusively in Japan. The game features several contrasting modes of gameplay, including side-view platforming, top-view, and horizontal shoot 'em up. In 2021, Piko Interactive is bringing back the Japanese exclusive PC Engine CD version for a worldwide release, together with a newly made Amiga CD32 version.

The soundtrack was composed by Chris Hülsbeck.

Legacy
A different game retaining certain aspects and levels from Jim Power in Mutant Planet was released for other platforms as Jim Power: The Lost Dimension in 3-D.

References

External links
Jim Power in Mutant Planet at Amiga Hall of Light
Jim Power in Mutant Planet at Atari Mania

1992 video games
Amiga CD32 games
Amiga games
Amstrad CPC games
Atari ST games
Piko Interactive games
Platform games
Single-player video games
TurboGrafx-CD games
Video games developed in France
Video games scored by Chris Huelsbeck
Virtual Studio games